Fremont Peak Park is a half-acre (2,023 m²) park located in Seattle, Washington, located on a bluff in the Fremont neighborhood just south of N. 45th Street at 4357 Palatine Ave. N. It was opened to the public on November 10, 2007.

The park was created through donations and public funding including the Seattle Pro Parks Levy. Continuing stewardship of the park has been primarily through the efforts of the volunteer organization known as the Friends of Fremont Peak Park (FoFPP).

External links

Friends of Fremont Peak Park
Seattle Parks and Recreation
Seattle Times article on the park
Description by the lead artists, Haddad|Drugan

Parks in Seattle
Fremont, Seattle